Nero in metastasi is the sixth studio album by Italian grindcore band Cripple Bastards. It was released on February 17. 2014 via Relapse Records.

Track listing

Personnel
Giulio the Bastard - vocals
Schintu the Wretched - bass
Der Kommissar - guitar
Wild Vitto - guitar
Al Mazzotti - drums

Guest/session musicians
Gianluca Fontana - backing vocals
Marco Guasconi - backing vocals
Nino the Bastard - backing vocals
Twys - electronic

Production
Fredrik Nordström - recording, mixing
Peter In De Betou - mastering
Carlo "The Hand of Doom" Altobelli - vocals recording
Nicola Fornasari - layout, art direction
Mauro Galligani - photography (front cover)
Shyla Nicodemi - photography (band)
Angela Arnone - lyrics translation
Henrik Udd - recording, mixing

References

2014 albums
Cripple Bastards albums
Relapse Records albums